Bradford Bulls Players have played for the Bradford Bulls rugby league team.

Former Super League Players

  Paul Anderson
  Ryan Atkins
  Michael Banks
  Marcus Bai
  Chris Birchall
  Graeme Bradley
  Chris Bridge
  Justin Brooker
  David Boyle
  Sam Burgess
  Matt Calland
  Gary Christie
  Richard Colley
  Paul Cook
  Matt Cook
  Brandon Costin
  Kevin Crouthers
  Paul Deacon
  Jason Donahue
  Jeremy Donougher
  Bernard Dwyer
  Shaun Edwards
  Abi Ekoku
  Karl Fairbank
  Brett Ferres
  Stuart Fielden
  Mike Forshaw
  Daniel Gartner
  Stanley Gene
  Lee Gilmour
  Nathan Graham
  Jon Hamer
  Gareth Handford
  Neil Harmon
  Shontayne Hape
  Ben Harris
  Carlos Hassan
  Richard Hawkyard
  Ian Henderson
  Tommy Hodgkinson
  Andy Hodgson
  Harvey Howard
  Phil Howlett
  Matt James
  Ben Jeffries
  Paul Johnson
  Warren Jowitt
  Simon Knox
  Toa Kohe-Love
  Davide Longo
  Paul Loughlin
  James Lowes
  Brad Mackay
  Graham Mackay
  Nathan McAvoy
  Brian McDermott
  Craig McDowell
  Chris McKenna
  Steve McNamara
  Paul Medley
  Brad Meyers
  Richard Moore
  Glen Morrison
  Adrian Morley
  Scott Naylor
  Terry Newton
  Sonny Nickle
  Rob Parker
  Henry Paul
  Robbie Paul
  Danny Peacock
  Jamie Peacock
  Karl Pratt
  Leon Pryce
  Karl Pryce
  Lee Radford
  Stuart Reardon
  Tahi Reihana
  Shane Rigon
  Jon Scales
  Roger Simpson
  Aaron Smith
  Andy Smith
  Hudson Smith
  David Solomona
  Stuart Spruce
  Gareth Stanley
  Marcus St Hilaire
  Logan Swann
  Semi Tadulala
  Glen Tomlinson
  Tame Tupou
  Lesley Vainikolo
  Tevita Vaikona
  Joe Vagana
  Alex Wilkinson
  Michael Withers
  Jeff Wittenberg
  Nick Zisti
  Carl Winterburn

Former Bradford Northern Players

 

  

 

 

 

 

 

 

 

 

 
 

 (Dewsbury early 1980s)

Team of Century

Head coach
00 Brian Noble
Kit man 
00 Fred Robinson

Players Receiving Testimonial matches

Ronald "Ron" Barritt (Testimonial match 1989)
Michael "Mick" Blacker (Testimonial match 1977)
Paul Deacon (Testimonial match 2008)
Jon Hamer (Testimonial match 1994)
Brian McDermott (Testimonial match 2002)
Steve McGowan (Testimonial match 1993)
Keith Mumby (Testimonial match 1985)
Brian Noble (Testimonial match 1988)
Robbie Paul (Testimonial match 2006)
Alan Redfearn (Testimonial match 1983)
David Redfearn (Testimonial match 1981)
Dennis Trotter (Testimonial match 1981
Ernest Ward (Testimonial match 1950)
Frank Whitcombe(Testimonial match 1948)

Players earning International Caps while at Bradford
 
For players earning International Caps while at Bradford, see Bradford Bulls internationals.

Bradford Bulls players
Bradford Bulls players